Bloxham, Tom may refer to:

 Tom Bloxham (property developer) (born 1963), English property developer
 Tom Bloxham (footballer) (born 2003), English footballer